Dean Trust Wigan (formerly 'Abraham Guest Academy) (formerly Abraham Guest High School) is a coeducational secondary school with academy status located in the Orrell area of the Metropolitan Borough of Wigan, Greater Manchester.The school has been shortlisted as Wigan and Leigh Secondary school of the year for 2021

History
Previously a foundation school administered by Wigan Metropolitan Borough Council, Abraham Guest High School converted to academy status in January 2012 and was renamed Dean Trust Wigan in April 2017 as it joined a trust of good and outstanding schools across the North West., however it continues to coordinate with Wigan Metropolitan Borough Council for admissions.

Academics
DTW offers GCSEs, BTECs and vocational courses as programmes of study for pupils. The school also offers a number of adult education courses in the evening to the local community.

Notable former pupils
Limahl, pop singer

References

External links
Dean Trust Wigan official website

Secondary schools in the Metropolitan Borough of Wigan
Academies in the Metropolitan Borough of Wigan